Pleasant Township is one of the sixteen townships of Brown County, Ohio, United States. The 2010 census found 5,745 people in the township, 1,417 of whom lived in the unincorporated portions of the township.

Geography
Located in the southern part of the county along the Ohio River, it borders the following townships:
Scott Township - north
Franklin Township - northeast
Jefferson Township - east
Union Township - southeast
Lewis Township - west
Clark Township - northwest

Bracken County, Kentucky lies across the Ohio River to the south.

The village of Georgetown, the county seat of Brown County, is located in northern Pleasant Township.

Name and history
It is one of fifteen Pleasant Townships statewide.

Pleasant Township was established in 1801.  In 1833, eighteen mills operated in Pleasant Township.

Government
The township is governed by a three-member board of trustees, who are elected in November of odd-numbered years to a four-year term beginning on the following January 1. Two are elected in the year after the presidential election and one is elected in the year before it. There is also an elected township fiscal officer, who serves a four-year term beginning on April 1 of the year after the election, which is held in November of the year before the presidential election. Vacancies in the fiscal officership or on the board of trustees are filled by the remaining trustees.

References

External links
County website

Townships in Brown County, Ohio
Townships in Ohio
1801 establishments in the Northwest Territory